Manuel José Monerris Barberá (19 March 1946 – 29 August 2021) was a Spanish politician. A member of the People's Party (PP), he served in the Parliament of the Balearic Islands as well as Mayor of Ferreries from 2011 to 2015.

Biography
Monerris graduated from the National University of Distance Education in 1977 and briefly played in the lower categories of CD Castellón. In 1977, he was elected Director of the Escola Castell de Santa Àgueda de Ferreries, a position he held until 1989. From 1996 to 2003 and again from 2008 to 2010, he was Director of the IES Biel Martí de Ferreries.

Also in 2011, he was elected Mayor of Ferreries.

Manuel Monerris died on 29 August 2021 at the age of 75.

References

1946 births
2021 deaths
21st-century Spanish politicians
People's Party (Spain) politicians
Members of the Parliament of the Balearic Islands
Mayors of places in the Valencian Community
National University of Distance Education alumni
People from Castellón de la Plana